Gorodishchna is a rural locality (a selo) and the administrative center of Gorodishchenskoye Rural Settlement, Nyuksensky District, Vologda Oblast, Russia. The population was 701 as of 2002. There are 9 streets.

Geography 
Gorodishchna is located 38 km southeast of Nyuksenitsa (the district's administrative centre) by road. Zhar is the nearest rural locality.

References 

Rural localities in Nyuksensky District